

William Clifford (christened 14 December 1811 – 5 September 1841) was an English cricketer who played for Kent county teams between 1834 and 1841. He was a right-handed batsman and a slow bowler who often fielded as a wicket-keeper.

Clifford was christened at Bearsted in Kent in December 1811. He was the son of Robert and Catherine Clifford; his grandfather, also  Robert Clifford, was a well-known all-rounder who bowled leg breaks for Kent sides at the end of the 18th-century and made more than 70 appearances in top-level matches. William's brother, Francis Clifford, also played in first-class matches for Kent County Cricket Club during the mid-19th century.

Playing club cricket for a range of sides, including Bearsted and Leeds, William Clifford made his first-class cricket debut in 1834. Renowned as one of the best batsmen in the Kent side, he played 17 of his 29 first-class matches for Kent teams, often opening the batting. He played four times for the Players against the Gentlemen and for England sides and three times for the South against the North. In 1841 he opened a cricket ground, Rucks Lane, at Gravesend and played his final first-class matches the same year.

Clifford worked as a wheelwright before becoming a publican at Gravesend in 1837. He died in September 1841 of a "bilious fever". He was probably aged less than 30.

Notes

References

Bibliography
Birley D (1999) A Social History of English Cricket. London: Aurum Press. 
Carlaw D (2020) Kent County Cricketers A to Z. Part One: 1806–1914 (revised edition). (Available online at the Association of Cricket Statisticians and Historians. Retrieved 2020-12-21.)
Milton H (1999) The Bat & Ball Gravesend: a first-class history. Gravesend: Gravesend Cricket Club. 
Milton H (2020) Kent County Cricket Grounds. Worthing: Pitch Publishing.

External links

1811 births
1841 deaths
English cricketers
English cricketers of 1826 to 1863
Kent cricketers
North v South cricketers
People from Bearsted
Players cricketers
Fast v Slow cricketers